Lizeth López (born ) is a Mexican female volleyball player. She is a member of the Mexico women's national volleyball team and played for Baja California in 2014. 

She was part of the Mexico national team at the 2014 FIVB Volleyball Women's World Championship in Italy. and 2018 FIVB Volleyball Women's World Championship.

Clubs
  Baja California (2014)

References

1990 births
Living people

Mexican women's volleyball players
Place of birth missing (living people)